Ali Haider Gillani is the son of former Prime Minister of Pakistan Yousuf Raza Gillani. He was a member of Provincial Assembly of Punjab from August 2018 till January 2023.

Abduction
On 9 May 2013, he was kidnapped in his home district of Multan after unidentified gunmen attacked a gathering of the PPP. After three years, Ali, on 10 May 2016 was recovered in a operation by Afghan commandos in Ghazni, Afghanistan.

Political career

He has been elected as member of Provincial Assembly of Punjab in 2018 Pakistani General Election from constituency PP-211. He was found in a leaked video where he was showing MNA's about wasting the vote just a night before the senate elections 2021 and being probed in election commission of pakistan for this video.

References

Kidnapped Pakistani people
Yousaf Raza Gillani
2013 in Pakistan
Pakistani expatriates in Afghanistan
Pakistani people of Iranian descent
Children of prime ministers of Pakistan
Ali Haider
Living people
Year of birth missing (living people)